Traveler(s), traveller(s), The Traveler, or The Traveller may refer to:

People
Anyone engaged in travel

Groups
 Romani people, or Roma, or Gypsies, and their subgroups in various countries
 Indigenous Norwegian Travellers
 Irish Travellers
 Gutter punks, often associated with punk subculture 
 New Age travellers

Individuals
 List of people known as the Traveller

Arts and entertainment

Fictional characters
 The Traveler (Star Trek)
 The Traveller (James Herbert)
 Travellers, in the novel Earthworks by Brian Aldiss
 Travelers, in D.J. MacHale's Pendragon novel series
The Traveler, in the video game Destiny

Films
The Traveler (1974 film), an Iranian drama 
Traveller (1981 film), an Irish film starring Davy Spillane
Traveller (1997 film), an American crime drama
Traveller (1999 film), a Brazilian drama
The Traveller (2009 film), an Egyptian film
The Traveler (2010 film), an American–Canadian horror film 
Traveller (2012 film), Linde Nijland's official music video 
Travelers: Jigen Keisatsu ("Travelers: Dimension Police") a 2013 Japanese science fiction film

Games
Traveller (role-playing game), 1977
Travellers (card game)

Literature

Periodicals
The Traveler (magazine), a Chinese tourism magazine
The Traveller, another name for the British Journal, an English newspaper published from 1722 to 1728
The Travelle, a 19th century British evening newspaper; see Walter Coulson
 Boston Evening Traveller, a newspaper published from 1845 to 1967

Books, poems, and short stories
Traveler, a 2007 novel by Ron McLarty
Traveler (novel series), by D. B. Drumm
Traveller (novel), by Richard Adams, 1988
The Traveler (novel), a 2005 novel by John Twelve Hawks
The Traveler, 1 1987 novel by John Katzenbach
The Traveler, a 1991 novel by Don Coldsmith
The Traveler: An American Odyssey in the Himalayas, a 1993 book by Eric Hansen
Travelers (novel), by Helon Habila, 2019
"The Traveller" (poem), by Oliver Goldsmith, 1764
The Traveller, a poem by James Dillet Freeman
"The Traveller", a short story by Richard Matheson

Music

Groups
The Travellers (band), a Canadian folk singing group
The Travellers (Maltese band), a band from Gozo, Malta

Albums
Traveler (Colin James album), 2003
Traveler (Hitomi album), 2004
Traveler (Steve Roach album), 1983
Traveler (Trey Anastasio album), 2012
Traveller (Anoushka Shankar album), 2011
Traveller (Chris Stapleton album), 2015
Traveller (Christy Moore album), 1999
Traveller (Jorn album), 2013
Traveller (Slough Feg album), 2003
The Traveler (Kenny Barron album), 2007
The Traveler (Rhett Miller album), 2015
Traveler (Official Hige Dandism album), 2019
The Traveler, an album by Billy Cobham, 1994
The Traveler, an album by Kenny Wayne Shepherd Band, 2019
The Traveller, an album by Shed, 2010, and his pseudonym
The Traveller, an album by Tineke Postma, 2009
Travellers, an album by Nucleus Torn, 2010

Songs
"Traveller" (song), 2015
"Traveller", a song by Aiko Kayō, 2004
"Traveller", title track of Traveller (Anoushka Shankar album), 2011
"Traveller", title track of Traveller (Jorn album), 2013
"The Traveller", a song by Joe Satriani from the 2002 album Strange Beautiful Music
"The Traveller", a song by A Flock of Seagulls from the 1983 album Listen
"The Traveller", a song by Chris de Burgh from the 1980 album Eastern Wind
"The Traveller", a song by Beach House from the 2015 album Thank Your Lucky Stars
"The Traveler", a song by Scale the Summit from the 2013 album The Migration

Television
Traveler (American TV series), 2007
Traveler (South Korean TV series), a 2019 
Travelers (TV series), a 2016 Canadian science fiction drama
"Travelers" (Stargate Atlantis), a 2007 episode
"Travelers" (The X-Files), a 1998 episode
"The Travelers", an episode of Dark
"The Travellers" a 2001 episode of The Lost World
"A Traveler", an episode of The Twilight Zone (2019 TV series)

Other uses in arts and entertainment 
The Traveler (sculpture), 1982, by Richard Beyer, in Bend, Oregon, U.S.
The Travelers (sculptures), surrealist sculptures by Bruno Catalano
Traveler curtain, or traveler, a front curtain in theaters

Horses
 Traveller (horse) (1857–1871), owned by General Robert E. Lee
 Traveler (horse) (1880–1912), American Quarter horse foundation sire
 Traveler (mascot), a horse mascot of the University of Southern California

Naval vessels
 , several Royal Navy ships
 USS Traveller (1805), a United States Navy supply boat in commission in 1805
 USS Traveler (SP-122), a United States Navy patrol boat in commission from 1917 to 1919

Science and technology
Costaconvexa centrostrigaria or traveller, a moth 
Traveller (nautical fitting)
Traveler, part of a ring spinning machine for the manufacture of textile yarn

Sports
 Delhi Travellers, a junior ice hockey team in Canada
 Little Rock Travelers, a defunct American baseball team
 Arkansas Travelers, an American baseball team

Other uses
 Traveler Mountain, in Maine, U.S., whose highest peak is called The Traveler
 The Travelers Companies, an American insurance company
 Traveler (automobile), an American car produced in 1914–1915

See also

 Migrant (disambiguation)